The Grand Beatbox Battle (commonly abbreviated GBB) is an annual international beatboxing competition hosted by Swissbeatbox. The competition holds multiple tournaments for different forms and categories of beatboxing which include: Solo (or Showcase), Loopstation, Tag Team, Tag Team Loopstation, and Crew.

The event follows a traditional tournament format, where competitors take turns performing on a stage, and a panel of judges vote on the winner. To qualify for the tournament portion, beatboxers from around the world must submit "wildcards" online for an invitation or by winning another national and international competition, as well as pass an "elimination" round during the competition.

See also 

 List of beatboxers
 UK Beatbox Championships
 Breath Control: The History of the Human Beat Box
 Mouth drumming

References 

Beatboxing
World championships
Recurring events established in 2009